The 2017–18 network television schedule for the five major English commercial broadcast networks in Canada covers primetime hours from September 2017 through August 2018. The schedule is followed by a list per network of returning series, new series, and series canceled after the 2016-17 television season, for Canadian, American and other series.

CBC Television was first to announce its fall schedule on May 24, 2017, followed by Global on June 5, 2017, City on June 6, 2017, and CTV and CTV Two on June 7, 2017. As in the past, the commercial networks' announcements come shortly after the networks have had a chance to buy Canadian rights to new American series.

CTV Two and Global are not included on Saturday as they normally only schedule encore programming in primetime on Saturdays.

Legend 
 Light blue indicates Local Programming.
 Grey indicates Encore Programming.
 Light green indicates sporting events.
 Red indicates Canadian content shows, which is programming that originated in Canada.
 Magenta indicates series being burned off and other irregularly scheduled programs, including specials.
 Cyan indicates various programming.
 Light yellow indicates the current schedule.

Schedule 
 New series are highlighted in bold. Series that have changed network are not highlighted as new series.
 All times given are in Canadian Eastern Time and Pacific Time (except for some live events or specials, including most sports, which are given in Eastern Time). 
Most CBC programming airs at the same local time in all time zones, except Newfoundland time (add 30 minutes).
For commercial stations in the Central Time Zone, subtract one hour.
For commercial stations in the Atlantic and Mountain time zones, add one hour for programming between 8:00 and 10:00 PM. Programs airing at 10:00 PM ET/PT will generally air at 8:00 PM local on stations in these areas. For viewers in the Newfoundland time zone, add an additional 30 minutes to the Atlantic time schedule. 
Notwithstanding the above, timeslots may occasionally vary further in some areas due to local simultaneous substitution considerations, compliance with watershed restrictions, or other factors.
From February 8 to February 25, 2018, CBC coverage of the 2018 Winter Olympics in Pyeongchang, South Korea live in all time zones, encompassing all of primetime those days.

Sunday 

 Note: CTV aired the premiere of Star Trek: Discovery in simulcast with CBS on September 24.

Monday 

Note: The Bachelor runs from 7 p.m. to 9 p.m. Eastern when City has The Resident in simulcast.

Tuesday 

 Note: Until November 14, NCIS: New Orleans aired on Global at 7 pm eastern.
 Note: Ellen's Game of Games debuted on December 18 on CTV at 10 pm and airs back to back episodes on January 2.
 Note: CTV has Roseanne scheduled for pre-release at 7:30 pm eastern.

Wednesday 

Note: Big Brother Canada airs at 7 p.m. Eastern, outside of Primetime hours.

Thursday 

 Note: As of November 2, CTV airs Grey's Anatomy airs at 7 p.m. Eastern.

Friday

Saturday

By network

Cancellations/series endings

YTV
Chuck's Choice—Series Finale Ended on June 9, 2017, after one season.

See also
2017–18 United States network television schedule

References

 
 
Canadian television schedules